Maja Sofia Stark (born 10 December 1999) is a Swedish professional golfer. She has six Ladies European Tour titles and earned LPGA Tour membership through her victory at the 2022 ISPS Handa World Invitational. As an amateur she was in contention at the 2020 and 2021 U.S. Women's Open, and after turning professional in August 2021 she won two tournaments in three starts on the Ladies European Tour.

Amateur career 
Stark grew up in Abbekås, Skåne County, and joined the Swedish National Team in 2016. She represented her country at the European Girls' Team Championship, where Sweden won the silver in 2016 and the gold in 2017. She was then part of the Swedish teams that won the European Ladies' Team Championship in 2018, 2019 and 2020, teamed with Frida Kinhult, Sara Kjellker, Ingrid Lindblad, Linn Grant, and Beatrice Wallin. She was also a member of the 2017 European Junior Solheim Cup team.

In August 2019, Stark made two starts in the LET Access Series and was runner-up at both, the Anna Nordqvist Västerås Open and the Swedish PGA Championship.

Stark was a freshman at Oklahoma State University in 2019–20, where she won the Hurricane Invitational in just her second career start. She won the 2020 Arnold Palmer Cup at Bay Hill Club and Lodge, Bay Hill, Florida with the International team. In her sophomore year Stark joined Pernilla Lindberg (2008) as Big 12 Conference Player of the Year, and was the Big 12's lone WGCA First Team All-American. She won two individual titles and ended the season ranked No. 4 by GolfStat with a 49–2 record in head-to-head competition against top-100 players in the country. She recorded a stroke average of 70.48, which destroyed the previous school record (71.14) set by Caroline Hedwall in 2010.

Stark rose to 6th place in the World Amateur Golf Ranking in July 2020 and received an exemption for the 2020 U.S. Women's Open as one of the 20 leading amateurs, her first major championship, where she finished tied for 13th. At the 2021 U.S. Women's Open she was tied for 9th after the third round, and finished tied for 16th after a final round of 74.

Professional career 
Stark turned professional in August 2021, with the intention to play on the Swedish Golf Tour and by invitations on the Ladies European Tour (LET), aiming to qualify for the LPGA Tour through qualifying school. She won her first professional title, the PGA Championship by Trelleborgs Kommun on the LET Access Series, in her second career start the same month.

In early September, Stark claimed her first LET title at the Creekhouse Ladies Open, finishing four shots ahead of compatriot Linn Grant, in the process earning membership of the LET. Less than a month later, she won her second LET title at the Estrella Damm Ladies Open.

Stark started her 2022 LET season strong. She was runner-up and low woman at the Trust Golf Asian Mixed Stableford Challenge in Thailand, fending off all but Sihwan Kim of the Asian Tour. On the two stops of the LET's Australian swing, she was runner-up at the Australian Ladies Classic, one stroke behind Meghan MacLaren, and won the Women's NSW Open by five strokes ahead of compatriot Johanna Gustavsson.

In July she won the Amundi German Masters by one stroke over Leonie Harm and Jessica Karlsson, re-taking the top spot in the Order of Merit ahead of Linn Grant and Johanna Gustavsson.

In August, she won the ISPS Handa World Invitational in Northern Ireland with a commanding five stroke margin. The event, co-sanctioned between the LPGA and LET, was played concurrently with a tournament on the European Tour on the same course. The victory earned her membership of the LPGA Tour. Stark made her LPGA debut as a member at the Portland Classic where she finished top-10, three strokes behind winner Andrea Lee.

Stark started 2023 with a runner-up finish at the LPGA Tour's Hilton Grand Vacations Tournament of Champions in January, and won her sixth LET title four shots ahead of Linn Grant at the Lalla Meryem Cup in February.

Amateur wins
2013 Skandia Tour Distrikt #2, Skandia Tour Regional #6, Skandia Distrikt Skåne Final
2015 Skandia Tour Riks #1, Skandia Tour Elit #2, Skandia Tour Riks #4 
2016 Wake Up Skurup! Open – Futures Series
2017 Skandia Tour Elit #1 
2020 Hurricane Invitational 
2021 Heroes Ladies Intercollegiate, Mountain View Collegiate

Source:

Professional wins (7)

LPGA Tour wins (1)

Co-sanctioned by the Ladies European Tour.

Ladies European Tour wins (6)

 Co-sanctioned by the WPGA Tour of Australasia.
 Co-sanctioned by the LPGA Tour.

LET Access Series wins (1)

 Co-sanctioned by the Swedish Golf Tour.

Results in LPGA majors

CUT = missed the half-way cut
NT = no tournament
T = tied

World ranking
Position in Women's World Golf Rankings at the end of each calendar year.

Team appearances
Amateur
European Girls' Team Championship (representing Sweden): 2016, 2017 (winners)
European Ladies' Team Championship (representing Sweden): 2018 (winners), 2019 (winners), 2020 (winners), 2021
Junior Solheim Cup (representing Europe): 2017
Arnold Palmer Cup (representing the International team): 2020 (winners)

Source:

References

External links

Swedish female golfers
Oklahoma State Cowgirls golfers
LPGA Tour golfers
Ladies European Tour golfers
Sportspeople from Skåne County
People from Skurup Municipality
1999 births
Living people